Black, Starr & Frost is an American jewelry company. Founded in 1810, the company is the oldest continuously operating jewelry firm in the United States. The company has acted as a retailer, rather than manufacturer, for most of its history.

History 
Black, Starr & Frost's origins date back to Marquand & Co., founded in 1810 in New York City by silversmith Isaac Marquand, whose family immigrated from France. In 1839, the company was purchased by Henry Ball, Erasmus Tompkins, and William Black, and renamed Ball, Tompkins & Black until 1851 when it became Ball, Black & Company.

In 1876 it acquired its current name, Black, Starr & Frost, when new partners Cortlandt Starr and Aaron Frost joined the firm. In 1860, the firm opened a store at the intersection of the corner of Broadway and Prince Street in New York City, and 1912 moved to the southeast corner of Fifth Avenue and 48th Street, known as the diamond district. In 1929 it merged with Gorham to become Black, Starr & Frost — Gorham.

During the interlude from 1940-1962 it was known as Black Starr Frost Gorham as it partnered with Gorham Manufacturing Company; however the name reverted to Black, Starr & Frost in 1960.

Timeline 
1833: Black, Starr & Frost is the first to use plate-glass windows to display merchandise to pedestrians.

1837: Black, Starr & Frost crafted first class ring for West Point; continued to manufacture for West Point until 1909. Famous West Point grads who wore Black, Starr & Frost rings include President Ulysses S. Grant, General George A. Custer and General Douglas MacArthur.

1851: Black, Starr & Frost's pure gold four-piece tea service displayed at the London Crystal Palace Exhibition.

1859: Black, Starr & Frost provided more than $100,000 in pearls and diamonds to the bride Frances Amelia Bartlett as a gift from the groom Don Esteban Santa Cruz de Oviedo in the “Diamond Wedding” at St. Patrick's Cathedral.

1860: The Company received an order for more than $12,000 of jewelry and silverware from Edward, Prince of Wales.

1860: Built an elegant shop on Broadway and Prince Street. The first fireproof building in New York, it was constructed of white marble, and in its vaults the modern safe deposit system was fashioned.

1863: Created the Gillmore Medal, the inspiration for the first Congressional Medal of Honor. Medal, created by Ball, Black & Co., was issued on October 28, 1863, by Major General Quincy A. Gillmore, Commander of Union troops. Given to those who served during the Fort Sumter battle, the medal was among the first to recognize honor on the battlefield. Only about 400 were issued.

1863: The company created the Kearny Cross for acts of valor during war.

1865: Mary Todd Lincoln owed $64,000 to the firm at the time her husband was assassinated, which represents $11 million today.

1876: Cortlandt Starr and Aaron Frost joined the company, which officially became known as Black, Starr & Frost.

1876: Black, Starr & Frost built the first apartment building and jewelry salon on 28th Street and Fifth Avenue.

1911: Black, Starr & Frost made the key for the ceremonial opening of the New York Public Library.

1912: The C.T. Cook residence on Fifth Avenue and 48th Street was converted into the new home of Black, Starr & Frost. Not until the 1920s did other jewelers and diamond dealers join Black, Starr & Frost in this part of the city, which is recognized worldwide today as New York City's “Diamond District.”

1915: The auto-racing trophy known as The Astor Cup, was created by Black, Starr & Frost.

1917: Black, Starr & Frost sold a diamond necklace for $200,000 to stage star Peggy Hopkins Joyce, the inspiration for Lorelei Lee in the 1925 novel Gentlemen Prefer Blondes.

1921: Designed and produced the silver platter for The Davis Cup for the U.S. Lawn Tennis Association.

1928: Sold the 127-carat Portuguese Diamond for $373,000 to Hopkins Joyce.

1929: Black, Starr & Frost merged with Gorham Corporation, and was renamed Black, Starr, Frost-Gorham.

1930: Black, Starr & Frost acquired the diamonds and jewels of “Diamond Jim Brady,” a financier.

1931: Acquired the 25-carat “Lucky” Baldwin Ruby, named after California gold mining pioneer E.J. “Lucky” Baldwin. The ruby was purchased from Harry Winston, a gemstone broker.

1939: Displayed two unique jewel-encrusted Mystery Clocks – the only square-faced Mystery Clock in the world and the “Tree of Knowledge of Good and Evil” clock – at the New York World's Fair. Black Starr & Frost was one of five jewelers invited to exhibit at the New York World's Fair that year.

1949: Carol Channing portrays Lorelei Lee, inspired by Peggy Hopkins Joyce, in the Broadway musical Gentlemen Prefer Blondes, which mentions Black, Starr, Frost-Gorham in the song "Diamonds Are a Girl's Best Friend."

1953: Marilyn Monroe portrays Lorelei Lee in the film adaptation of Gentlemen Prefer Blondes, singing "Diamonds Are a Girl's Best Friend", which name-drops the jeweler.

1956: Manufactured the “Princeton Mace” – a ceremonial club – used at Princeton University for key observances at the school.

1962: Marcus and Company acquired Black, Starr, Frost-Gorham, and restored the name to Black, Starr & Frost.

1962: Black, Starr & Frost purchased Cartier USA. This was the first of many steps that expanded Black, Starr & Frost.

1972: Kay Jewelers acquired Black, Starr & Frost and expanded to 33 locations.

1986: New York's The Plaza Hotel became home to another Black, Starr & Frost jewelry salon.

1990: Sterling Inc. acquired Kay Jewelers and Black, Starr & Frost.

1991: Paul Lam, Costa Mesa, California, acquired Black, Starr & Frost.

2006: The Molina Group acquired Black, Starr & Frost and relocated its headquarters to Phoenix.  Since then, Alfredo J. Molina has served as chairman and CEO.

2012: Black, Starr & Frost sold the Archduke Joseph Diamond, a 76-carat, D-color, internally flawless diamond, the largest D color internally flawless Golconda diamond in the world for $21.5 million at Christie's Geneva Magnificent Jewels auction, setting three world records for the sale of a colorless diamond.

2014: Chairman Alfredo J. Molina publishes 1810: Celebrating Two Centuries of American Luxury.

2015: Black, Starr & Frost designed and crafted The Empress: A $4.5 million necklace which features 30 untreated Burmese sapphires totaling 11.9 carats; 34 oval diamonds, weighing 10.56 carats; and 404 round diamonds totaling 82.61 carats – all set in platinum.

2015: Black, Starr & Frost, America's oldest watchmaker, debuts the first new collection of luxury timepieces, its first new designs in three decades.

References

Jewelry companies of the United States
Companies based in Phoenix, Arizona
Manufacturing companies established in 1810
Watch manufacturing companies of the United States
American companies established in 1810